Angela Eleine Thomas  is a consultant paediatric haematologist and former director of the haemophilia centre, Royal Infirmary of Edinburgh.

Biography 
Angela Thomas qualified in medicine in 1980 from Barts and The London School of Medicine and Dentistry. She trained in adult haematology, subsequently specialising in paediatric haematology.

She is on the National Emergency Stockpile Quality Panel 

She is vice-chair of the Commission on Human Medicines and chairs the Clinical Trials, Biologicals & Vaccines Expert Advisory Group.

She is a Scientific Committee Member and expert with the European Medicines Agency.
She was awarded an OBE for services to the regulation of public health in the 2018 New Years Honours.

She was appointed as Acting President of RCPE in June 2020.

References 

British women medical doctors
Fellows of the Royal College of Physicians of Edinburgh
Living people
Fellows of the Royal College of Pathologists
Year of birth missing (living people)